Beaudoin is a surname of French origin related to Baldwin. The name may refer to:

 Alexandre Beaudoin (born 1978), Canadian forensic fingerprint scientist
 Andre Beaudoin (fl. 1988–2008), Canadian Paralympian athlete
 Denise Beaudoin (born 1949), Quebec politician, member of the National Assembly of Quebec 2003–07
 Doug Beaudoin (born 1954), American football player
 Édouard Beaudoin (fl. 1900–1908), French Olympic archer
 Eric Beaudoin (born 1980), Canadian ice hockey player
 Gérald Beaudoin (1929–2008), Canadian lawyer and senator
 Gilles Beaudoin (1919–2007), Quebec politician, Mayor of Trois-Rivières
 Kenneth Lawrence Beaudoin (–1995), American poet
 Laurent Beaudoin (born 1938), Quebec businessman, CEO of Bombardier Inc.
 Léonel Beaudoin (1924–2021), Canadian politician, member of the Canadian House of Commons 1968–79
 Louise Beaudoin (born 1945), Quebec politician, member of the National Assembly of Quebec
 Louis-René Beaudoin (1912–1970), Canadian politician, Speaker of the Canadian House of Commons 1953–1957
 Marie-Andrée Beaudoin (fl. 2005–2009), Quebec politician, borough mayor of Ahuntsic-Cartierville
 Mathieu Beaudoin (born 1984), Canadian ice hockey player
 Mathieu Beaudoin (Canadian football) (born 1974), Canadian football player
 Michelle Beaudoin (born 1975), Canadian actress from Alberta
 Paul E. Beaudoin (born 1960), American composer, music theorist, and author
 Raymond O. Beaudoin (1918–1945), American army officer; recipient of the Medal of Honor for his actions in World War II
 Eponym of the ship USNS Lt. Raymond O. Beaudoin (T-AP-189)
 Sean Beaudoin (contemporary), American author
 Serge Beaudoin (born 1952), Canadian ice hockey player
 Yves Beaudoin (born 1965), Canadian ice hockey player

See also
 Beaudin
 Beaudouin
 Baudoin